The population of the United Kingdom was estimated at over 67.0 million in 2020. It is the 21st most populated country in the world and has a population density of 270 people per square kilometre (700 people per square mile), with England having significantly greater density than Wales, Scotland, and Northern Ireland. Almost a third of the population lives in south east England, which is predominantly urban and suburban, with about 9 million in the capital city, London, whose population density is just over 5,200 per square kilometre (13,468 per sq mi).

The population of the UK has undergone demographic transition—that is, the transition from a (typically) pre-industrial population, with high birth and mortality rates and slow population growth, through a stage of falling mortality and faster rates of population growth, to a stage of low birth and mortality rates with, again, lower rates of growth. This growth through 'natural change' has been accompanied in the past two decades by growth through net migration into the United Kingdom, which since 1999 has exceeded natural change.

The United Kingdom's high literacy rate (99% at age 15 and above) is attributable to universal state education, introduced at the primary level in 1870 (Scotland 1872, free 1890) and at the secondary level in 1900. Parents are obliged to have their children educated from the ages of 5 to 16 years (18 in England from 2013), and can continue education free of charge in the form of A-Levels, vocational training, and apprenticeship until the age of 18.

The United Kingdom's population is predominantly White British (81.88% at the 2011 Census), but due to migration from Commonwealth nations, Britain has become ethnically diverse. The second and third largest non-white racial groups are Asian British at 7% of the population, followed by Black British people at 3%.

The main language of the country is British English. Some Celtic languages, namely Scottish Gaelic and Irish, are still spoken by minorities in Scotland and Northern Ireland, respectively, and Cornish has been revived to a limited degree in Cornwall; but the predominant language in all these areas is English. Welsh is widely spoken as a first language in parts of North and West Wales, and to lesser extent in South East Wales, where English is the dominant first language.

History

Before the census, 200–1800 
Roman Britain had an estimated population between 2.8 million and 3 million at the end of the second century AD. At the end of the fourth century, it had an estimated population of 3.6 million, of whom 125,000 consisted of the Roman army and their families and dependents. The urban population of Roman Britain was about 240,000 people at the end of the fourth century. Roman Britain's capital city, Londinium, is estimated to have had a population of about 60,000.

Following the Roman withdrawal from Britain, Germanic tribes from continental Europe such as the Angles, Saxons and Jutes began a period of significant migration to the southeastern part of the island, notably bringing their language, Old English. Nevertheless, the overall population is believed to have fallen precipitously due to political upheavals and plagues. By the time of the compilation of the Domesday Book in the eleventh century, there may have between 1.25 and 2 million people living in England. Though the Domesday Book did not count the English population, it has been regarded as one of the first attempts to produce a census of the country.

Between the years of 1086 and 1750, the English population fluctuated in size due to civil war, famines and plagues. By the end of the 13th century, the population was estimated to have reached between four to six million people, but a combination of factors such as widespread famine and disease in the following century collapsed the population dramatically. An agricultural crisis in 1315 to 1322 and the Black Death in 1348 to 1350 collapsed the population by over a third of its pre-existing number, and the growth rate. By 1377, the population was estimated on a poll-tax of all people aged 14 and over, depending on the population amount of those under 14, to be around 2.2 million to 3.1 million.

Periods of instability over the 15th century such as the War of the Roses caused the population to, while grow, increase at a slowed pace. The general factors behind the slow increase was a high mortality rate due to war, less marriages within the population and late marriages, keeping fertility levels lower than they should have been for the time and a net emigration of English people out of the country. However in contrast to the preceding century, by the 16th century, this situation has elevated itself due to political stability under the Tudor monarchy and little civil unrest which would have resulted in a higher mortality rate. While this was overturned with the English Civil War in 17th century, it allowed the population to grow at a faster pace, causing the population of England to reach a pre-collapse total of 5.74 million by 1750. In Scotland, population growth was not to the same extent as it was in England, which resulted in being significantly lower in the late 17th and early 18th centuries, which is often ascribed to similar factors halting it such as a high mortality rate, especially for infants, and later marriage and childbearing patterns. Ireland on the other hand before the 19th century consistently had rapid population growth, which has been ascribed to higher fertility rates and earlier marriage than England. Furthermore the Plantation of Ulster in the 17th century also affected the population total of Scotland with an estimated 100,000 Scots migrating to Ulster, additionally, the Jacobite rebellion in 1745 also caused significant emigration. The estimated population total of Scotland in 1691 was 1.23 million.

The impetus to collect population data was reinforced due to food supply concerns and war against France in the late 18th century and the beginning of the early 19th century. In 1800, the Census Act was passed, authorising the first modern census in British history to be conducted.

Census established and the demographic transition, 1800 – 2000 
The first Census in 1801 revealed that the population of Great Britain was 10.5 million. Of this, England's population had grown to 8.3 million, Wales population rested at 0.6 million while Scotland had a population of 1.6 million. In Ireland, the population rested at an estimate of between 4.5 and 5.5 million inhabitants. Since 1801, a census has been conducted every decade, in Ireland this was conducted for the first time in 1821.

During the Industrial Revolution, the demographic transition started to occur within the United Kingdom, going from a pre-industrial society demographically to one of a industrialised society. By 1841 Census, the population of England and Wales rested at 15.9 million, doubling in the space of 40 years, for Ireland 8.2 million and for Scotland 2.6 million. This slowed rate of growth for Scotland may be attributed to higher net emigration of Scottish people out of the nation, and two typhus epidemics in 1837 and 1847.

Factors often associated with the beginning of the demographic transition began to change dramatically as well, which contributed to the rapid increase. For example, Child mortality decreased dramatically, the proportion of children born in London who died before the age of five decreased from 74.5 per thousand in 1730–1749 to 31.8 per thousand in 1810–1829. General mortality was thought to have declined as well, especially after 1850 as well as a increased birth rate caused the English population to sustain itself in the second phase of the transition from 1750 to 1870.

Due to this, in the second half of the 19th century the population of England continued to grow quickly from 16.8 million in 1851 to 30.5 million in 1901. This rapid growth was also seen in the other constituent nations. In Wales, the population increased from 0.6 million in 1801 to 2 million in 1901, in Scotland, the population increased from 1.6 million to 4.5 million in 1901. In contrast however and due to the Great Irish Famine, which began in the 1840s, caused the deaths of 1 million Irish people, and caused well over a million to emigrate. Mass emigration became entrenched as a result of the famine, and Ireland's population decreased rapidly, from 8.2 million in 1841 to 3.2 million in 1901. However this massive population collapse did not effect Northern Ireland to the same extent, due to being more industrialised and urbanised and while the population did decline, it had recovered itself by the beginning of the 20th century. This prolonged period of emigration and net population decline in Irish history was only reversed by the middle of the 20th century.

By the 1870s, the total fertility rate of the UK population declined from 4.88 children per woman in 1871, to 2.4 by 1921, representing a transition to the third stage of the demographic transition. Traditional means of birth control were used such as abstinence and withdrawal facilitated the collapse of the birth rate, this was also hastened by the 1930s by more modern methods of contraception which were beginning to be used with increased acceptance. From 1840 to 1930 there was a net emigration of English people out of the country which resulted in the population being stunted in the capacity it could have grown to.

During the first half of the 20th century, the United Kingdom began to approach the 4th stage of the demographic transition. The end of the First World War and the loss of lives of troops, coupled with an influenza outbreak is estimated to have caused the death of upwards of 900,000 people in the United Kingdom. This as a consequence shrunk the male population of the Lost Generation and altered the sex ratio, which slowed the growth rate of the population down. By the end of the Second World War, this transition had been completed and the society had a low but fluctuating birth rate, a low death rate and a slowed growth rate of the population. In 1948, the British Nationality Act was signed which allowed the access of the peoples of the British Empire's colonies to migrate to the country being classed in nationality as the same as a native of the United Kingdom. This law, while a unintentional side-effect, led to the start of modern migration to the United Kingdom.

The move into the 4th stage also took place during major social change in the United Kingdom throughout the 1960s. Liberalisation of society during the decade led to the 1967 Abortion Act which legalised abortion in the United Kingdom for the first time, and the 1969 Divorce Reform Act, which liberalised the circumstances under which someone can get a divorce. Between these years, the population fluctuated; from the 1950s onwards the population increased through natural growth but by the time of the mid 1970s the population decreased due to emigration, which took net migration to a negative, and deaths exceeding births. For the first time in 1973, the birth rate of the country fell below replacement level, due to the previous liberalising acts. By the 1980s, the decline of population growth had recovered to a extent due to a reversal of net emigration.

In the 1990s, international migration began to contribute more proportionally to population growth, and by 1998 this had passed natural increase as the main provider of growth. Liberalisation of immigration rules under the new government allowed rapid increase of the number of migrants arriving, quadrupling the number from a net migration rate of 50,000 a year, to 200,000 a year.

Modern century, 2000–present 
By the beginning of the 21st century, the population of the United Kingdom rested at a total of 59,113,000 people. In each constituent nation, the population of England was 49,449,700, Scotland had a population of 5,064,200, Wales had a population of 2,910,200 and Northern Ireland a population of 1,689,300. Increased international migration which began to rapidly increase at the end of the 20th century also has brought increased ethnic heterogenization to the British population, not only in ethnicity and race, but also in country of birth. In 2001, the White British population was registered to be 88.52% of the total population, but by 2011, this proportion of the population had dropped to 81.88%, with other ethnic groups either rising by 50% of their respective total population in 2001 or doubling entirely.

Such rapid immigration growth boosted population growth in the United Kingdom. In 2011, the population sat at around 63 million people.

Population 

The population of the UK in the last recorded census in 2011 was 63 million, of whom 31 million were male and 32 million female. The 2011 census recorded the population of England as 53.0 million, Scotland as 5.3 million, Wales as 3.1 million, and Northern Ireland as 1.8 million. At the last recorded population estimate, it was estimated that the UK population was at a total of 67,081,234 people.

There are 13 urban areas that exceed 500,000 inhabitants: they are centred on London, Birmingham, Glasgow, Leeds and Bradford, Southampton and Portsmouth, Sheffield, Liverpool, Leicester, Manchester, Belfast, Bristol, Newcastle upon Tyne and Nottingham.

According to the World Population Review, in 2019 there was:

 One birth every 39 seconds
 One death every 52 seconds
 A net gain of one person every minute
 One net migrant every 3 minutes

Population by constituent country

Population change over time 

The following table shows the total UK population estimated at census dates. Pre 1901 figures include the whole of Ireland, whereas from 1901 onwards only the population of Northern Ireland is included.

Population density calculated on:
 Pre-1901: 243,820 km2 total land area for the United Kingdom plus 70,273 km2 land area of the Republic of Ireland.
 Post-1901: its current boundaries.

Future projections 

The UK government first began publishing population projections for the country in the 1920's under the Government Actuary’s Department (GAD) which were mainly produced to be used for long-term financial estimates for pensions and other schemes of social insurance. However since the Second World War, population projections have taken an expanded role in all areas of influencing government policy. The GAD produced population projections every year from 1955 to 1979 and then switched it to every 2 years up to 1991. The Office of National Statistics took control of producing population projections for the country in 2006.

The British Office for National Statistics' 2016-based National Population Projections indicated that, if recent trends continue, the UK's population would increase by 3.6 million between mid-2016 and mid-2026. This represents an average annual growth rate of 0.5%. Over the same period, the population of England is projected to grow by 5.9%; for Wales, this figure is 3.1%, while for Scotland and Northern Ireland the figures are 3.2% and 4.2% respectively. These projections did not allow for any possible effects of the UK leaving the European Union.

Fertility 

Since 1838, it has been compulsory to register a birth or death in the United Kingdom.

First official data on the fertility rate of the country was first made available in 1938, However estimates of the total fertility rate can be made back all the way till 1541.

The fertility rate of the country before the 19th century maintained itself at an average of around 5 children per woman. This fertility rate within the United Kingdom has been falling since 1870, when the country began into transition into the 3rd stage of the demographic transition. This transition represents the change in reproductive strategy from how many children a mother 'needs' to more of how many she 'wants' and a substitution of quality over quantity in the offspring produced. From the 1880s onwards, the birth rate began to decline rapidly from the levels it had previous sustained itself at. In England this crude birth rate decline represented a 44% decrease over a period from 1875 to 1920.

A number of factors have been argued to have contributed to this ranging from four broad spectrums of biological, technological changes and developments in the society, socio-economic reasons and cultural considerations. In the context of the Industrial Revolution, a large number of socio-economic developments occurred; large scale urbanisation of the population caused mass internal movements of people to high density population centres, income per capita of citizens rose significantly especially in the last half of the 19th century, coupled with large scale economic growth improved the livelihoods of the working and middle classes of the United Kingdom, this growth in the standard of living led also to the collapse of mortality rates, which had been in decline since the early 18th century and more especially the infant mortality. This development came about with the decline of child labour at the same time as well which meant there was less of a need for a quantity of children to uphold the household economically, educational quality of the country rose during the same time period which meant that children held more a economical potential through educated labour means.

The decline and equalling out of the gender gap in terms of place in the workforce meant that women were beginning in the 19th century to become a larger part of the workforce which also contributed to the birth rate decline.

Improvements in public diets and nutritional quality increases, which are linked to biological factors such as a decline in lactation, have also been included as a potential factor in the decline of the fertility rate. Technological developments within the society also began to have an effect; contraceptive use become somewhat usable on a mass scale in the latter half of the 19th century due to technological developments in the production of rubber. Abortion, while illegal during the 19th century, was also used by women, however to what extent at the time is unknown.

Cultural considerations such as decline in religious adherence (albeit little data on this matter during the 19th century) have also been considered as reasons. While these factors altogether are debated by demographers as to which were more important than each other, it is generally accepted that due to these factors overall, mothers could begin to invest more time and nurture 'quality' into their offspring rather than having a increased 'quantity' of children that were needed in the past for various such reasons, and that this development led to the decrease of the total fertility rate.

By 1914, the birthrate sat at around 2.88 children per woman, however by 1918 had collapsed proportionally by almost 50% due to World War One and sank to 2.03 children. In the post-World War One period, while the birthrate of the country boomed at the very end of the war reaching a peak of 3.08 children in 1920, this began to endure a rapid decline and had slumped to historic lows by the 1930s, for the first time in the country's history falling below a replacement level fertility rate. This did not recover in-till the end of the Second World War in 1945.

In the post-World War Two period, the fertility rate of the country boomed once again, bringing itself out of the below replacement level in the 1930s to levels not seen since the late 19th century. This peaked in 1964, with a TFR of 2.95. However by 1973, the fertility rate of the country collapsed again below replacement, and has not since in the present day reached a replacement level again. However population issues such as the sub-replacement level fertility rate have often been categorised as something in which the government does not view as a major issue. Little incentives were made and have been made to increase the birth rate throughout the UK's post war period. However Wendy Singe argues that, while compared to other countries, the United Kingdom managed to retain a similarly 'high' (for post-war European standards) fertility rate with a quote; 'liberal market economy and residual approach to welfare, a combination of high female employment and relatively high fertility has been achieved without a coherent or generous set of work-family reconciliation policies.'

Family planning policies were enacted during the 1970s due to concerns of rapid population growth during the 1960s. The 1973 NHS Reorganisation Act is an example of such policies, within this act family planning advice and supplies were first issued to the public. Over this time period, with previous liberalising acts such as the Abortion Act and the Divorce Reform Act, and scientific developments such as increased access to contraceptive methods to reduce pregnancies, such as the contraceptive pill, it is generally ascribed that these social changes were the major contributors to the decline of the fertility rate below replacement level in the latter half of the 20th century. With these changes also, pre-marital conceptions fell to 1950 levels by the late 1970s. This pattern of decline of the birth rate is similar to other European countries.

The government's position was further presented and then re-iterated in 1984 at the UN Conference on Population in Mexico;The United Kingdom('s) government does not pursue a population policy in the sense of actively trying to influence the overall size of the population, its age-structure, or the components of change except in the field of immigration. Nor has it expressed a view about the size of population, or the age-structure, that would be desirable. ...The current level of births has not been the cause of general anxiety. The prevailing view is that decisions about fertility and childbearing are for people themselves to make, but that it is proper for government to provide individuals with the information and the means necessary to make their decisions effective. To this end, the government provides assistance with family planning as part of the National Health Service. The ‘ageing’ of the population does raise social and economic issues. However, it is believed that these will prove manageable; and also, to a degree, that society will adapt....’ In 2003, Right to Request was setup which allowed the parents of small children to request flexible working times which included shorter working hours for parents to care for their children. However, although a majority of requests for Right to Request are accepted, a report in 2006 found that its impact was negligible as mothers tended to switch employers to get reduced hours regardless.

Due to migration beginning in the late 90s and especially during the 2000s lead to the overall total fertility rate of the country to rise by 0.1 in the period of 2004 to 2011.

In 2012, the UK's total fertility rate (TFR) was 1.92 children per woman, below the replacement rate, which in the UK is 2.075. In 2001, the TFR was at a record low of 1.63, but it then increased every year until it reached a peak of 1.96 in 2008, before decreasing again. In 2012 and 2013, England and Wales's TFR decreased to 1.85. In Scotland however TFR is lower: it decreased from 1.75 in 2010 to 1.67 in 2012. Northern Ireland has the highest TFR in the UK, standing at 2.02 in 2010 and 2.03 in 2012.

Mother's mean age at first birth 
The first available data on when a mother gives birth for the first time was in 1920.

The reduction of the total fertility rate of the United Kingdom has also had an effect on the mean age in which a mother gives birth to her first child.

The age in which a mother gives birth to her first child has changed depending on the time period, but since the 1970s the age in which someone gives birth has been trending upwards.

Family size 
The reduction of the fertility rate has also had an effect on the general family size of mothers in the United Kingdom, with the two being interlinked with each other. The family size of the average UK family can be estimated with a completed family size (CFS), which is an estimate of the amount of children a woman has birthed by the end of her childbearing years.

Family size within the UK has shifted towards two or one children in recent decades, rather than in the past when larger family sizes were more prominent and sought after. This pattern is similar to other European countries, where couples are having fewer children. Increasingly, there are also more couples who are completely childless; this has been increasing since the 1950s.

Life expectancy 

Life expectancy has increased in the United Kingdom since the 18th century due to the Industrial Revolution and then the Second Industrial Revolution which has vastly increased quality of life of the country's citizens.

At the start of the 20th century, the life expectancy at birth was only 45.6 years.

By 1950, life expectancy at birth had risen to 68.6 years. During the latter half of the century, further factors influenced the increase of life expectancy: diseases and the improvement of healthcare in the 1950s, decline in smoking in the mid-1970s and improvements in treating heart disease in the 1990s contributed to its decline.

At the start of the 21st century, the life expectancy at birth was 77.8 years.

In 2011 the life expectancy at birth of the UK was around 80.4 years, but the rate of increase has been stalling. Potential factors behind this may be austerity measures imposed in the beginning of the 2010s, which coincidentally since then mortality rates have slowed down in decline or older people dying off at faster rates than expected. On the topic of austerity measures, Professor Richard Faragher has said that "It is possible to have high or rising life expectancy during austerity, as is the case in Japan. Similarly, you can have rising life expectancy despite high levels of inequality – this was the case in Britain from 1900-1950." but noted that austerity measures to social services like the NHS, especially social care support for the elderly may be causing a stalling of life expectancy increase due to a decreased quality of life for older generations.

Infant mortality 

Infant mortality has been on the decline since the Second Industrial Revolution, although the majority of the decline came around from the start to the end of the 20th century. In raw terms for example, infant mortality in England sat around 151 deaths to 1000 live births in 1901 but by the end of the century it had plummeted down to only 6 deaths per 1000 births.

There are two general lines of thought which are usually taken from into analysing the decline of infant mortality rates, the first line of thought comes from social historians, who ascribe the decline of infant mortality to social phenomenons of the time such as the need for a healthy population for the sake of the nation's fighting capabilities and political issues surrounding women. The second line of thought comes from demographers themselves which more or less ascribe the decline of infant mortality itself more to the general decline of mortality altogether in the society than any particular reason why.

Physical unfitness during the Boer War came into national prominence as many recruits came back to be too medically unfit for service. With this, In 1904, the Report of the Inter-Departmental Committee on Physical Deterioration was published which listed large amounts of details of the failings of the British population, and for that matter government, in sustaining a healthy population.

The current rate of infant mortality in the United Kingdom is roughly around 3.82 deaths per 1,000 live births.

Age structure 

Interlinked with fertility and mortality, The age structure of the United Kingdom has varied with how rates of fertility and mortality have changed throughout the country's history. Due to the transition to an industrialised society, the United Kingdom has also undergone a 'demographic transition': that is to say, that it has gone from a high birth rate, high mortality rate society to a low birth rate, low mortality rate society over the space of two centuries.

Before the 18th century, the United Kingdom retained an age structure universal to societies in the first stage of the transition theory, with high fertility rates and high mortality rates, in the late 18th century, the Industrial Revolution began, kickstarting the country's transition into the second phase: mortality rates declined but birth rates stayed at the same level; by 1870, the country had begun to transition into the third phase: the birth rate began to decline from around near 5 children per woman to below replacement level in the 1930s. The fourth phase of the transition began in the 1960s, when the fertility rate rose, and peaked during the middle of the decade, and then collapsed by 1973 to a below replacement level rate. Since then, the rate has not risen to an above replacement level fertility rate; this has resulted in a population which is currently ageing: in 2007, for the first time in the country's history, there were more people over the age of 60 than there were under the age of 16.

Peaks and bands within the population represent different periods in which people were born, for example, a large peak of people in particularly for those aged 70–74 born following the Second World War and a wide band for those aged 50–59, born during the 1960s baby boom. Those aged 80 upwards would have been born in the 1930s baby dearth when the birth rate was below replacement level. On the younger band of the population there is a noticeable gap between the ages of 14 to 20, this due to at the beginning of the 21st century a lower number of children being born (and a subsequent lower TFR), however in the years following the birth rate rose during the 2010s and a 'broadening' of the pyramid began for those in the younger years leading to more children in those age cohorts. In relation to the sex ratio of the country, in the higher ages of the population, there are more women than men reflecting the higher life expectancies of women in the population, in the lower ages there are more men than women because there are slightly more boys than girls born each year. In relation to the older age brackets, In 2015, there were estimated to be over half a million people (556,270) aged 90 and over living in the UK, up from 194,670 people in 1985, and there were estimated to be 14,570 centenarians (people aged 100 or over) and 850 people aged 105 or over. The Office of National Statistics has also wrote in their mid-2016 report on population projections that the median age of the British population was 40 years of age, and this will continue to rise as more people in the population age and a below-replacement level fertility level not refilling the population. This will make the number of people aged 85 and over double from 1.6 million in mid-2016 to 3.2 million in mid-2041.

The demographic ageing of the population is not evenly spread geographically, as people in rural areas are typically of a higher age than those living in metropolitan areas such as Greater London for example.

Urbanisation and population density

Population density 
The United Kingdom is one of the most densely populated countries in Europe, in 2020 it was the 8th most densely populated country.

The current largest metropolitan areas are listed below:

Urbanisation 

Rapid urbanisation began with the onset of the Industrial Revolution in the mid to late 18th century, shifting jobs and more importantly people away from rural Britain's dominance at the time which was primarily agricultural, to manufacturing jobs within urban areas which started to spring up. In 1750, an estimated total of around only 1 million people lived in some sort of urban area such as a town or city, which was around 1/6th of the estimated total population but a century later this had risen to 8 million people in 1850, equating to just over half of the nation.

While this mass urbanisation affected pre-existing cities to a large degree such as London, smaller and 'newer' towns were in particular effected by the re-distribution of the population and exploded in raw population growth. Cities such as Birmingham, Bristol, Edinburgh, Glasgow, Liverpool, Manchester, Leeds, Sheffield and Newcastle for example had an explosive expansion in population numbers around the middle of the 19th century due to the industrial expansion of said cities bringing jobs and again people in for work. London during the 19th century become noted as the 'premier city' of the world, being the most populated city from 1825 to 1900 and being the first city in Europe and one of the first in the world to reach the figure of one million inhabitants, and then 5 million inhabitants. This urbanisation in the 19th century has had two phases. David Herbert describes the process of the late 19th century and the early 20th century as a "maker and breaker" of the cities in the United Kingdom. This mass influx of the population into the cities resulted in a centralisation of the population into the inner city areas however by the time of the late 19th century and early 20th century when technological advancements in transport kicked off allowing cities to expand their 'peripherals' from the inner areas to create large scale 'city regions' of their own. London in particular, is a great example of this in effect, during the 19th century, the majority of people within the city lived in the inner part, however by the 20th century a massive expansion of 'Outer London' began which slowly became larger in population size by the middle of the century than Inner London.

By the end of the 20th century this figure was 80% of the country. However importance of the capital declined, by the end of the 20th century, London's ranking on the most populated cities of the world had fell down to not even being in the top 20.

The current classification of an 'urban' area, also termed as a 'built-up area' (BUA) in the 2011 census, is a settlement which takes variables from both numerical population numbers and population density; in population numbers this is roughly more than or 10,000 people living in a area. Anything below that is classified as 'rural', having several levels of distinction to define a rural town and fringe, village or hamlet which is usually taken from population density figures. These areas are then defined within 'output areas' (OA's) themselves, which are geographic areas of the United Kingdom. The population which resides within classified 'urban' areas was 84.4% of total population in 2022 and the annual rate of urbanisation change is estimated to be around 0.8% between 2020 and 2025.

Vital statistics (1900–2022)

Current vital statistics

Social issues

Marriage, divorce, families and household types

Marriage and divorce 

In 2004, 58% of births were conceived within a married couple, 35% by non-married couples registered by both parents and 7% by non-married mothers who registered the birth alone.

This varied from each constituent nation, Wales for example had the highest births outside of marriage at 51% in 2004, In England this percentage was 42% and in Scotland 47%. Northern Ireland had the lowest of 35% in 2004.

Household and family type

Sexual orientation 

The Integrated Household Survey, published by the Office for National Statistics, provides the following estimates for the adult British population as of 2011:
 1.1 per cent (approximately 545,000 adults at the time of the survey) identify as gay or lesbian.
 0.4 per cent (approximately 220,000 adults) identify as bisexual.
 0.3 per cent identify as "other".
 3.6 per cent of those surveyed replied "don't know" or refused to answer the question.
 0.6 per cent of those surveyed provided "no response" to the question.
 An estimated 2.7 per cent of 16-year-olds to 24-year-olds in the UK identify as gay, lesbian or bisexual compared with 0.4 per cent of those aged over 65.

Other sources provide alternative estimates of the population by sexual orientation. For example, one British journal published in 2004 estimated that approximately 5% of the British population is gay. A government figure estimated in 2005 that there are 3.6 million gay people in Britain equating to 6 per cent of the population, though a report by the Equality and Human Rights Commission described that estimate as 'of questionable validity' when set against available survey estimates.

The Gender Identity Research and Education Society (GIRES) estimated in 2009 that "56,000 might potentially be transsexual people", noting that it is very difficult to make a reliable estimate which would have been 0.09% of the population at the time of the report.

Out of the 600,000 people in the UK that applied to go to university through UCAS in 2020, 7.2%, or 40,000, described themselves as LGBT on their application form. UCAS estimates this to be a rate 2.5 times higher than the overall UK population. The UCAS report in collaboration with Stonewall also found LGBT students were more likely to come from disadvantaged backgrounds (compared to those who identified as heterosexual or didn't specify), have a disability (compared to non-LGBT students) and have a mental health condition (compared to non-LGBT students).

Abortion 

Abortion in the United Kingdom (however not Northern Ireland) was officially legalised in 1967 under the Abortion Act of that year, allowing women for the first time to get an abortion under numerous medical grounds outlined within the act. Previously, this was outlawed under the Offences against the Person Act of 1861 and then the updated Infant Life (Preservation) Act of 1929 which only permitted an abortion if the death of a child was "done in good faith for the purpose only of preserving the life of the mother".

In 2020, the amount of conceptions which led to an abortion was around 25.3%

Health

Death rate and cause

Health issues

Employment and income 

The unemployment rate for the youth age bracket of 15–24 was 11.2% in 2019 – 13% for males and 9.2% for females.

Migration

Historical and present net numbers 

Migration to the UK has varied through its history. Irish migration from the Great Famine predominated during the 19th century. Additionally Jewish migration from Russia also arrived famously into Bethnal Green in London. Refugees from Belgium in the First World War arrived in the first half of the 20th century, however they would return by the wars end.

Starting from the 1950s onwards, following on from the British Nationality Act of 1948 which de jure allowed the migration of upwards 800,000,000 British subjects who were now British citizens in law, modern mass migration to the United Kingdom began. During this decade West Indians from the Caribbean, those from Jamaica and so on began to arrive.

During the middle of the 1960s to the 70s, migration flipped in origin to the majority of those arriving being of South Asian origin from the Indian sub-continent. Immigration restrictions, in response to the ever increasing number arriving, were introduced, such as the Commonwealth Immigrants Act of 1962, Commonwealth Immigrants Act of 1968 and the Immigration Act of 1971.

Through the 1970s, 80s and early 90s, net migration to the United Kingdom was often negative in terms of numbers, with more people leaving the country, than entering in total. 

Since 1994, net migration in numbers has been in the positives, with more people entering the country, rather than leaving. Migration increased fourfold following the election of Tony Blair in 1997, immigration restrictions were undone such as the primary purpose rule.

In 2004, along with Ireland and Sweden, Britain was one of the only countries within the EU to not allow 'transitional controls' on migration flows from the newly joined A8 countries from Eastern Europe. Around 453,000 immigrants, which has been revised upwards in recent years, from these new counties were estimated in 2015 to have migrated to the UK.

Country of birth 
Country of birth was first asked as a census question in 1841.

In the 1980s to 1990s, around 12 to 13% of births were born to foreign born mothers. In 2004, this had risen to 20% of births being born to foreign born mothers.

Below is the number of births in England and Wales in 2011 by mother's country of birth, as well as their total fertility rate. 
In 2014, 27% of births were to mothers born outside the UK, a 0.5-point increase since 2013. The 2014 fertility rate was higher for foreign-born mothers (2.09) than British-born mothers (1.76). In the 2010–14 time period, the most common countries of birth for mothers (excluding the UK) were Poland, Pakistan and India; and Poland and India for fathers. Within the UK, Newham, London had the highest rate of births to non-UK mothers (76.7%) and Torfaen, Wales the lowest (3.2%). The fertility rate among non-UK born women was 1.98 and among UK born women 1.50 in 2020.

Internal 
Population movements of the country have fluctuated over time, in the 19th century with the urbanisation of the country, large amounts of people moved to the capital and the nearby industrial cities, but in recent years there has been a general trend of 'de-urbanisation' as parts of the population have moved back to the countryside. An example of recent large scale internal movement in the 21st century has been the departure of 220,000 White British Londoners to other areas of rural England and Wales over the 2000s and over the 2010s around a total of 550,000 people left the city. Demographically by age, the people leaving the city more than entering tend to be in their 30s and 40s while people entering in their 20s.

Ethnicity

Ethnic demographic breakdown 

Note:

Geographic distributionAge structure of ethnic groups

Ethnicity of school pupils

Ethnicity of live births and total fertility rate

Future projections 

Numerous predictions and projections of the future ethnic demography of the United Kingdom have been made over the years.

In 2010, academic David Coleman produced research postulating a future demographic decline of the White British in Britain, indicating that they would become a minority in Birmingham and London during the 2020s. He also estimated that around 2056 to 2066, the trend of a declining share of the white populace will result in the United Kingdom having an overall white minority.

In Prospect, he outlined four projections for a majority-minority scenario within the United Kingdom;

 If net immigration trends (in 2010) continued its overall trend of 254,000 a year and net emigration of the White British was 74,000 a year (180,000 per year), the White British would decline to 59% of the total population by 2051, 'Other Whites' projected to be at 10% and non-Whites projected to be 31% of the population. By 2066 this would inevitably lead to the White British being a minority of the population.
 If migration to the United Kingdom was to decline to a net inflow of 80,000 per year, the White British would be 63% of the population by 2051 and would fall below 50% in 2080.
 Using a cross-party group of MP's recommendation of 'balanced migration', where there is neither a net inflow or outflow, where immigration only consists of 74,000 a year and emigration of the White British the same, the White British would be 67% of the population by 2051 and then fall below 50% by the end of the century.
 If there is no emigration of citizens and no immigration to the United Kingdom ('natural change' scenario), then the White British would remain at around 80% of the population by 2051 and would still remain the majority by the end of the century, albeit a reduced percentage (roughly around 75 - 70%)
 A fifth estimate, made by the Philip Rees and the University of Leeds, estimate that if assumptions about ethnic self-identification are taken into account, and that there is a net outflow of citizens at 38,000 a year, most of which are non-white and long term net migration like mentioned turns negative, this would result in the White British remaining at around 80% of the population by 2051, 20% of which would be ethnic minorities and 15% of that 20% would be non-white.

Religion

In 2001, the question of religious adherence was asked for the first time since 1851 in the United Kingdom Census.

The traditional religion in the United Kingdom is Christianity. In England the established church is the Church of England (Anglican). In Scotland, the Church of Scotland (a Presbyterian Church) is regarded as the 'national church' but there is not an established church.

In Wales there is no established church, with the Church in Wales having been disestablished in 1920. Likewise, in Ireland, the Church of Ireland was disestablished in 1871. In Northern Ireland and parts of Western Scotland there are lingering sectarian divides between Roman Catholic and Protestant communities.

The table below shows data regarding religion for the 2001 and 2011 censuses:

In the 2011 Census, rather than select one of the specified religions offered on the Census form, many people chose to write in their own religion. Some of these religions were reassigned to one of the main religions offered. In England and Wales, 241,000 people belonged to religious groups which did not fall into any of the main religions. The largest of these were Pagans (56,620), Spiritualists (39,061) and Jains (20,288). Despite its high-profile nature there were only 2,418 Scientologists. The census also recorded 176,632 people stating their religion as Jedi Knight and 6,242 people as Heavy Metal after a campaign by Metal Hammer. These returns were classified as "No religion", along with Atheist, Agnostic, Humanist, and Free Thinker. Those who ticked Heathen who had been categorised as no religion in 2001 were categorised as other. It is unclear how the ONS treated people who ticked "Other" but did not write in any religion.

In 2012 the British Social Attitudes Survey found the highest number to be non-religious (48%) followed by Christians (46%) with another six per cent identifying otherwise. Discrepancies found between surveys may be the result of differences in phrasing, question order, and data collection method.

Future projections 
Pew Research Center has found that by 2050 on all scenario's, the Islamic population of the United Kingdom will rise, depending on the scenario the percentage of the population which will be Islamic will either be 9.7% in a zero migration scenario, 16.7% in a medium migration scenario or 17.2% in a high migration scenario.

Languages

The United Kingdom's de facto official language is English which is spoken as a first language by 95% of the population. Six regional languages—Scots, Ulster-Scots, Welsh, Cornish, Irish and Scottish Gaelic—are protected under the European Charter for Regional or Minority Languages. Abilities in these languages (other than Cornish) for those aged three and above were recorded in the census of 2011 as follows.

Cornish is spoken by around 2,500 people. In the 2011 census, 464 respondents aged three and over in Cornwall said that Cornish was their main language, amounting to 0.09% of the total population of Cornwall aged three and over.

After English, Polish was the second most common language given in the United Kingdom census 2011. 618,091 respondents aged three and over said that Polish was their main language, amounting to 1.01% of the total population of the United Kingdom aged three and over.

The French language is spoken in some parts of the Channel Islands although the islands, like the Isle of Man, are not part of the United Kingdom.
British Sign Language is also common.

National identity
Respondents to the 2011 UK census gave their national identities as follows.

Education

In the present day each country of the United Kingdom has a separate education system, with power over education matters in Scotland, Wales and Northern Ireland being devolved.

Universal state education in England and Wales was introduced for primary level in 1870 and secondary level in 1900. Education is mandatory from the ages of 5 to 18, The majority of children are educated in state-sector schools, only a small proportion of which select on the grounds of academic ability. Despite a fall in actual numbers, the proportion of children in England attending private schools rose slightly from 7.1% to 7.3% between 2004 and 2007.

Scotland first legislated for universal provision of education in 1696. Four percent of children in Scotland attend private schools, a rate which has remained relatively stable since 2015.

In Wales, one of the most notable distinctive features of education in Wales is the emphasis on the Welsh language – lessons in which are compulsory for all until the age of 16. Whilst a significant minority of students (15.7% in the 2014\15 academic year) are taught primarily through the medium of Welsh.

See also

Demography of England
Demography of Scotland
Demography of Wales
Demography of Northern Ireland
Demography of London
Demography of Birmingham
Demography of Liverpool
Demography of Greater Manchester
City status in the United Kingdom
List of cities in the United Kingdom
List of urban areas in the United Kingdom
Genetic history of the British Isles

Notes and references

Notes

References

Bibliography 
 
 
 Census 2001 website
Abstract (1833). Abstract of the Answers and Returns made pursuant to an act passed in the eleventh year of the reign of His Majesty King George IV intituled an act for taking an account of the population of Great Britain, and the increase and diminution thereof. Population Register Abstract 1831. British Parliamentary Papers, 38.
Arkell, T. (1992). An Examination of the Poll Taxes of the late Seventeenth Century, the Marriage Duty Act and Gregory King.
K. Schürer, & T. Arkell (eds.), Surveying the People: the interpretation and use of document sources for the study of population in the late seventeenth century (pp. 142–177). Oxford: Leopard's Hill Press.
Boulton, J. (1992). "The Marriage Duty Act and parochial registration in London, 1695–1706". In: K. Schürer, & T. Arkell (eds.), Surveying the People: the interpretation and use of document sources for the study of population in the late seventeenth century; pp. 222–252. Oxford: Leopard's Hill Press.
Boulton, J. (1993). "Clandestine marriage in London: an examination of the neglected urban variable", in: Urban History; 20, pp. 191–210.